Blas Antonio Pérez Ortega (born 13 March 1981) is a Panamanian footballer who plays as a forward for the Dallas Sidekicks in the Major Arena Soccer League.

Club career
Pérez began his career in his native Panama with Panamá Viejo. He made his debut with the club in 1998 and went on to score 27 goals in 56 matches. In 2001, he joined Árabe Unido and continued his goal scoring form. In 2002, he joined top Uruguayan side Nacional. The following season, he left for Colombia signing with Envigado, scoring a goal on his debut against Independiente Medellin in the process. After one season at the club he joined Centauros and went on to score 29 goals in 37 matches, catching the attention of one of Colombia's top clubs Deportivo Cali. For the 2005 season he signed with Cali and remained at the club for two years in which he continued with his goal scoring form. In 2006 Perez joined Cúcuta. With Cúcuta, Perez won the Copa Mustang in 2006 against Deportes Tolima. In 2007 Cúcuta and Blas Perez made their debut in Copa Libertadores, in which Blas scored eight goals, including two against Argentina's Boca Juniors. The eight goals were the second-most in the tournament.

On 29 May 2007 Spanish Segunda División team Hércules CF signed Super Ratón on a four-year contract in which they acquired 50% of the players rights. It was valued at US$2.7 million, with Blas Perez earning 60 thousand dollars per month. Perez enjoyed a brief stay in Spain in which he scored four goals in 16 matches.

On 18 January 2008 he signed with UANL Tigres, his seventh club in his career and first in Mexico. He played for Pachuca for the 2009 Clausura in a loan deal after Miguel Sabah's transfer to Pachuca did not work out. He scored eight goals in 15 matches with Pachuca.

After his impressive display in the 2009 CONCACAF Gold Cup, Al Wasl FC of Dubai was able to secure Blas Pérez services to play in the UAE League based on Al Wasl's new coach Alexandre Guimarães recommendation. He stayed there only for the first half of the 2009–10 season before moving back to Mexico to play for San Luis. After having played 17 games in the Torneo Bicentenario and 2 in the 2010 edition of the Copa Libertadores and having scored 5 goals in both tournaments, he was released at the end of the season. He was later signed by Club León from the Liga de Ascenso in the 2010 edition of the Mexican draft. he rediscovered his goal scoring form with Club León with 19 goals in 28 matches. For the second half of the 2011 season he was again sent on loan this time to Indios. For the 2012 Major League Soccer season, he signed with FC Dallas. On 2 December 2015, it was announced that FC Dallas would not be renewing Perez's contract.

On 16 February 2016, Perez was traded to Vancouver Whitecaps FC for Mauro Rosales. At the conclusion of the 2016 season Perez's contract was not renewed. On 31 January 2017, Pérez signed with Panamanian club, C.D. Árabe Unido.

On 25 November 2018, Pérez retired from playing professional football.

Pérez signed with the Dallas Sidekicks of the Major Arena Soccer League in July 2022. Pérez scored twice in his arena soccer debut against Chihuahua Savage on 10 December 2022.

International career
Pérez made his debut for Panama in a March 2001 friendly match against El Salvador and has, as of 6 June 2016, earned a total of 106 caps, scoring 41 goals. He is Panama's third all-time record cap behind Gabriel Gómez and Jaime Penedo and second all-time leading goalscorer after Luis Tejada. He represented his country in 22 FIFA World Cup qualification matches and played for Panama at the 2007 Gold Cup, in which they were eliminated in the quarterfinals by the U.S. He ended up as Panama's top scorer, with three goals and one assist. Blas Perez was also named in the 2007 Gold Cup "Best XI". He also played at the 2009, 2011, 2013, 2015 Gold Cups and Copa América Centenario.

In May 2018 he was named in Panama's preliminary 35 man squad for the 2018 FIFA World Cup in Russia.

International goals
Scores and results list Panama's goal tally first.

Assault attempt
On 23 July 2009, two cars chased Pérez's Nissan 350Z early at the morning while he was travelling along the La Chorrera highway. The assaulting cars intercepted him when one of them collided with it forcing it to stop. Pérez managed to escape from the attackers and sustained no injuries but his car was heavily damaged.

Personal life
Pérez holds a U.S. green card which qualifies him as a domestic player for MLS roster purposes.

Honours and awards

Deportivo Cali
Categoría Primera A: 2005

Cúcuta Deportivo
Categoría Primera A: 2006

Individual
 CONCACAF Gold Cup All-Star Team: 2007

See also
 List of men's footballers with 100 or more international caps

References

External links

Profile - FC Dallas

1981 births
2001 UNCAF Nations Cup players
2005 UNCAF Nations Cup players
2007 CONCACAF Gold Cup players
2009 CONCACAF Gold Cup players
2011 CONCACAF Gold Cup players
2011 Copa Centroamericana players
2013 CONCACAF Gold Cup players
2013 Copa Centroamericana players
2014 Copa Centroamericana players
2015 CONCACAF Gold Cup players
2018 FIFA World Cup players
Al-Wasl F.C. players
Association football forwards
C.D. Árabe Unido players
C.F. Pachuca players
C.S.D. Municipal players
Categoría Primera A players
Categoría Primera B players
Centauros Villavicencio footballers
Club Blooming players
Club León footballers
Club Nacional de Football players
Copa América Centenario players
Cúcuta Deportivo footballers
Deportivo Cali footballers
Envigado F.C. players
Expatriate footballers in Bolivia
Expatriate footballers in Colombia
Expatriate footballers in Mexico
Expatriate footballers in Spain
Expatriate footballers in Uruguay
Expatriate footballers in the United Arab Emirates
Expatriate soccer players in Canada
Expatriate soccer players in the United States
FC Dallas players
FIFA Century Club
Hércules CF players
Indios de Ciudad Juárez footballers
Liga MX players
Liga Nacional de Fútbol de Guatemala players
Liga Panameña de Fútbol players
Living people
Major League Soccer players
Panama international footballers
Panamanian expatriate footballers
Panamanian expatriate sportspeople in Canada
Panamanian expatriate sportspeople in Mexico
Panamanian expatriate sportspeople in the United States
Panamanian expatriate sportspeople in Colombia
Panamanian expatriate sportspeople in Spain
Panamanian expatriate sportspeople in Uruguay
Panamanian expatriate sportspeople in the United Arab Emirates
Panamanian footballers
Panamá Viejo players
San Luis F.C. players
Segunda División players
Sportspeople from Panama City
Tigres UANL footballers
UAE Pro League players
Uruguayan Primera División players
Vancouver Whitecaps FC players
Dallas Sidekicks (2012–present) players
Major Arena Soccer League players